The following units and commanders fought in the Chattanooga–Ringgold campaign of the American Civil War on the Union side. The Confederate order of battle is shown separately. Order of battle compiled from the army organization during the campaign, the casualty returns and the reports.

Abbreviations used

Military rank
MG = Major general
BG = Brigadier general
Col = Colonel
Ltc = Lieutenant colonel
Maj = Major
Cpt = Captain
Lt = Lieutenant

Other
w = wounded
mw = mortally wounded
k = killed
c = captured

Military Division of the Mississippi

MG Ulysses S. Grant

General Staff:
Chief of Staff: BG John A. Rawlins
Chief of Transportation: Col Joseph D. Webster

Army of the Cumberland

MG George H. Thomas

General Staff:
Chief of Staff: MG Joseph J. Reynolds
Assistant Adjutant General: BG William D. Whipple

General Headquarters:
1st Ohio Sharpshooter: Cpt Gershom M. Barber
10th Ohio: Ltc William M. Ward

IV Corps

MG Gordon Granger

XIV Corps

MG John M. Palmer

Escort:
1st Ohio Cavalry, Company L: Cpt John D. Barker

Artillery Reserve
BG John M. Brannan

Cavalry Corps

Engineers and garrison

Hooker's Command
MG Joseph Hooker

Chief of Staff: MG Daniel A. Butterfield
Escort:
15th Illinois Cavalry, Company K: Cpt Samuel B. Sherer

XI Corps

MG Oliver O. Howard

General Headquarters:
8th New York, Independent Company: Cpt Anton Bruhn

XII Corps

Army of the Tennessee

MG William T. Sherman

XV Corps

MG Francis P. Blair

XVII Corps

Notes

References
Eicher, John H. and David J., Civil War High Commands, Stanford University Press, 2001, 
U.S. War Department, The War of the Rebellion: a Compilation of the Official Records of the Union and Confederate Armies, U.S. Government Printing Office, 1880–1901.

American Civil War orders of battle